Valgerahu is an Estonian island.

See also
List of islands of Estonia

Islands of Estonia
Ridala Parish